The Sierra Juárez and San Pedro Mártir pine–oak forests is a Nearctic temperate coniferous forests ecoregion that covers the higher elevations of the Sierra Juárez and Sierra San Pedro Mártir ranges of the Peninsular Ranges, of the northern Baja California Peninsula of Mexico. The pine–oak forests extend throughout the central portion of the Mexican state of Baja California and terminate near the border with the U.S. state of California.

Setting
It lies at the southeastern extent of the Mediterranean climate region that covers much of California and the northwestern corner of Baja California, and the climate is temperate with winter rains. It is one of the southernmost ecoregions of the temperate coniferous forest biome in North America, and the only instance of this biome in Mexico.

Flora
These forests are predominantly pine, juniper, fir, and oak. Ten pine species can be found in the ranges, including Tamarack Pine (Pinus contorta subsp. murrayana), Sugar Pine (Pinus lambertiana), Jeffrey Pine (Pinus jefferyi) Parry Pinyon (Pinus quadrifolia), along with White Fir (Abies concolor subsp. lowiana), and California Incense Cedar (Calocedrus decurrens). Oak species include Coast Live Oak (Quercus agrifolia), Engelmann Oak (Quercus engelmannii), Canyon Live Oak (Quercus chrysolepis), Baja Oak (Quercus peninsularis), and Island Oak (Quercus tomentella). There are also several isolated strands of aspens (Populus tremuloides) on the higher altitudes.

Tecate Cypress (Cupressus forbesii) and San Pedro Martir Cypress (Cupressus arizonica subsp. Montana) are found in scattered groves across the range. The Sierra Juárez and San Pedro Mártir pine–oak forests are near the southern limit of the distribution of the California Fan Palm (Washingtonia filifera). The higher portions of these Peninsular Ranges harbor many rare and endemic species.

See also
 List of ecoregions in Mexico

References

Ecoregions of Mexico
Forests of Mexico
 
Natural history of Baja California
Montane forests
Nearctic ecoregions
Temperate coniferous forests